Melissa Jane Nathan (13 June 1968 – 7 April 2006) was a journalist for about 12 years and then started writing comedy novels in 1998. She was a popular UK author of "chick lit" novels in the early 2000s.

She was born and raised in Hertfordshire, and educated at Haberdashers' Aske's School for Girls, Elstree.

When working on Persuading Annie (2001), Nathan was diagnosed with breast cancer. She refused to let the illness dominate her life, and – in public anyway – was unfailingly positive. She had no time for most journalism written by cancer sufferers: "self-indulgent dirges without a helpline in sight", as she described them; she tried to joke about cancer's unoriginality in her Jewish Chronicle column and then added:

Ironically, the characters in Nathan's first book, Pride, Prejudice and Jasmin Field, were starring in a play version of Pride & Prejudice that benefitted breast cancer research. The book was written prior to Nathan knowing about her own future diagnosis with the disease.

Her book The Nanny was listed on the Top Ten of The Sunday Times in 2003.

She died aged 37 from breast cancer in April 2006. She is survived by her husband, Andrew Saffron, and their son, Sam.

Her final novel, The Learning Curve, was published posthumously in August 2006. A writing award has been established to recognise quality comedy romance writers in her honour.

Bibliography

Novels
 Pride, Prejudice and Jasmin Field (2000)
 Persuading Annie (2001)
 The Nanny (2003)
 The Waitress (2004)
 The Learning Curve (2006)
 Acting Up (2008) – Pride, Prejudice and Jasmin Field renamed and republished.

External links
Guardian obituary
Melissa Nathan Foundation
Penguin Books – Melissa Nathan

1968 births
2006 deaths
Deaths from breast cancer
English Jews
British chick lit writers
British women novelists
21st-century British novelists
21st-century British women writers
People educated at Haberdashers' Girls' School